The 2003 Nigerian Senate election in Imo State was held on April 12, 2003, to elect members of the Nigerian Senate to represent Imo State. Amah Iwuagwu representing Imo East, Ifeanyi Ararume representing Imo North and Arthur Nzeribe representing Imo West all won on the platform of the Peoples Democratic Party.

Overview

Summary

Results

Imo East 
The election was won by Amah Iwuagwu of the Peoples Democratic Party.

Imo North 
The election was won by Ifeanyi Ararume of the Peoples Democratic Party.

Imo West 
The election was won by Arthur Nzeribe of the Peoples Democratic Party.

References 

April 2003 events in Nigeria
Imo State Senate elections
Imo